Glenbrook is a village in the townland of Lackaroe, between Passage West and Monkstown in County Cork, Ireland. Monkstown, Glenbrook and Passage West are three villages along Cork Harbour's R610 route. The Cross River Ferry at Glenbrook links the Owenabue Valley with East Cork, Fota Island and Cobh.

History
Glenbrook was originally a seaside resort with buildings like the Turkish Bath-houses which became established there. The first of these was the Royal Victoria Monkstown and Passage Baths, which opened in 1838. This was followed by Dr Timothy Curtin's Hydropathic Establishment. Passage West, which also has a maritime tradition, is next to Glenbrook and the two are somewhat indistinguishable as there is no obvious border between the two. It is from here that Captain Roberts set out and crossed the Atlantic in the first passenger steamship, "The Sirius". A plaque, along with a piece of the ship, commemorates this journey and is sited next to the Cross River Ferry in Glenbrook. The old railway line, once a method of transport ferrying customers to the summer resort town and the Turkish baths, is now a walking trail next to Cork Harbour.

Transport
Glenbrook railway station opened on 1 August 1902 and finally closed on 12 September 1932.

See also
 List of towns and villages in Ireland

References

Towns and villages in County Cork